Eilema aurantisquamata is a moth of the  subfamily Arctiinae. It is found in Kenya and Malawi.

References

aurantisquamata
Moths of Africa
Moths described in 1918